Jaltomata chihuahuensis is a plant species native to the Mexican States of Chihuahua and Durango.

Jaltomata chihuahuensis is a prostrate, trailing herb with bristly shoots. Flowers are cream-colored with pale yellow-green markings. Fruits are light purple to green at maturity.

References

chihuahuensis
Flora of Chihuahua (state)
Flora of Durango